S. Petersen's Field Guide to Cthulhu Monsters is a sourcebook published by Chaosium in 1988 for the horror role-playing game Call of Cthulhu.

Contents
S. Petersen's Field Guide to Cthulhu Monsters is a 64-page sourcebook that describes 27 frequently encountered monsters of the Cthulhu mythos, each with a full-page full-color painting and tips for easy recognition, and it includes a key for identification and a chart denoting relative sizes.

Publication history
S. Petersen's Field Guide to Cthulhu Monsters was written by Sandy Petersen with Lynn Willis, with art by Tom Sullivan and was published by Chaosium in 1988 as a 64-page book.

Reception
In the October 1988 edition of Dragon (Issue #138), Ken Rolston called this "a useful game reference" that "manages to take itself fairly seriously while maintaining an atmosphere of fun." Rolston called Petersen's writing "a perfect example of Chaosium’s masterful control of tone and diction." He concluded, "This is delicious. Buy several for your best friends and hope that some day the gaming hobby will produce works of equal charm to describe monstrous species for other fantasy and science-fiction role-playing settings."

Reviews
Jeux & Stratégie #55 (as "Les Monstres de Cthulhu")

Awards
S. Petersen's Field Guide to Cthulhu Monsters was awarded the Origins Award for "Best Graphic Presentation of a Roleplaying Game, Adventure, or Supplement of 1988".

References

Call of Cthulhu (role-playing game) supplements
Origins Award winners
Role-playing game supplements introduced in 1988